Jaungulbene is a village in Gulbene Municipality, Latvia.

See also 
 Jaungulbene Manor

External links 
 

Towns and villages in Latvia
Gulbene Municipality